European route E 853 is a European B class road in Greece and Albania, connecting the city Ioannina – border Albania.

Route 
 
 E90, E92, E951 Ioannina
 border Albania 
 SH4 Gjirokastër-Tepelene-Fier-Durrës

External links 
 UN Economic Commission for Europe: Overall Map of E-road Network (2007)
 International E-road network

International E-road network
Roads in Greece
European routes in Albania